Latruncellus is a monotypic genus of fungi within the family Cryphonectriaceae containing the sole species Latruncellus aurorae.

References

External links 
 

Monotypic Sordariomycetes genera
Diaporthales